In the United States, the length of a nail is designated by its penny size, written with a number and the abbreviation d for penny; for example, 10d for a ten-penny nail. A larger number indicates a longer nail, shown in the table below. Diameter of the nail also varies based on penny size, depending on nail type. Nails under  inch, often called brads, are sold mostly in small packages with only a length designation or with length and wire gauge designations; for example, 1″ 18 ga. or ″ 16 ga.

Penny sizes originally referred to the price for a hundred (100) or long hundred (120) nails in England in the 15th century: the larger the nail, the higher the cost per long hundred. The system remained in use in England into the 20th century, but is obsolete there today. Nails are still designated in penny sizes in the United States.

In Canada, nails are specified by the type and length and are still manufactured to Imperial dimensions. Nail diameter is specified by gauge number (British Imperial Standard). The gauge is the same as the wire diameter used in the manufacture of the nail.

The d is an abbreviation for denarius, a Roman coin similar to a penny; this was the abbreviation for the monetary penny in the United Kingdom before decimalisation.

References

Obsolete units of measurement
Units of length
Nail (fastener)